Arohn Kee (born September 18, 1973) a.k.a. the "East-Harlem Rapist” is an American serial killer and serial rapist who is responsible for four rapes and at least three murders of teenaged girls in different street blocks of East Harlem, located in Manhattan, New York City from 1991 to 1998.

Murders 
On January 24, 1991, Kee, then only 17, killed a 13-year-old schoolgirl named Paola Illera. He raped, stabbed and strangled her.

Subsequently, Kee would stalk lone women, follow them to a secluded area and rape them before fleeing.

On September 13, 1997, Kee attacked 19-year-old Johalis Castro in the basement of her apartment building. He raped and stabbed her to death, then burned her body to possibly prevent recognition. 

On June 2, 1998, Kee raped and murdered 18-year-old Rasheeda Washington.

Exposure and manhunt  
In January 1999, The New York Police Department (NYPD) conducted DNA testing on the biological evidence found on Rasheeda Washington's body. The DNA was linked to two Manhattan rape victims in 1995 and 1996 and led to the identity of the offender, Arohn Kee, who was now 25. The NYPD put up a reward of $11,000 for any information leading to his arrest.

Kee, now wanted, kidnapped a 15-year-old girl named Angelique Stalling from her Brooklyn apartment and flew her out to Miami, Florida, sparking a manhunt across the east coast of the United States. In the weeks after, Kee and Stalling rented many hotels, frequently moving from place to place around Miami. Miami police stormed his hotel room on the evening of February 19, 1999. They rescued Stalling and flew her back to New York. Kee was soon flown back to New York, where he was charged with the murder of Rasheeda Washington, the kidnapping and false imprisonment of Stalling, and the two rapes from 1995 and 1996. Further testing of his DNA brought to light his involvement in the then unsolved murders of Paola Illera and Johalis Castro, as well as another rape from 1992.

His trial started in 2000, with Kee being charged in all three murders and three other rapes, to which he pled not guilty. During the trial, Kee took the stand to make a statement in which he ranted that he was being framed, and that the DNA testing that was being used to convict him was fake, even though surviving victims identified him as their rapist. On December 16, 2000, the jury found him guilty of all three murders and the three other rapes. When the verdict was read, Kee yelled “Fuck all of y’all!” At his sentencing in January 2001, he made a statement and apologized for how he was acting at his trial. He was sentenced to three consecutive terms of life imprisonment.

2004 trial  
After his conviction, authorities continued to conduct DNA testing on unsolved cases in the Harlem area to see if they could link a match in Kee's DNA to the evidence at the crime scenes. The testing was completed in 2004, and after that the NYPD now wanted to charge Kee with the July 1994 unsolved rape of a 17-year-old girl in her Harlem basement apartment. Kee's DNA was a match to the DNA the perpetrator had left on the girl.

His trial was ordered to start in June 2004, but instead of pleading his innocence, he fully admitted what he did, saying that he was now reformed and ready to win forgiveness. During the trial, Kee showed signs of remorse for what he had done, fully admitting his guilt, and asked for forgiveness during a statement. On August 12, 2004, Kee was sentenced to 20 years in prison for the rape to run concurrent with his three life sentences.

In media
Kee's crimes were featured in the episode "The Shopping Cart Killer" in the television show Cold Case Files.

The case was dramatized in the last episode of television show The New Detectives.

See also 
 List of serial killers in the United States

References 

1973 births
20th-century American criminals
American kidnappers
American male criminals
American murderers of children
American people convicted of murder
American prisoners sentenced to life imprisonment
American rapists
American serial killers
Criminals from Manhattan
Living people
Male serial killers
Murder committed by minors
People convicted of murder by New York (state)
Prisoners sentenced to life imprisonment by New York (state)
Violence against women in the United States